Nihel Cheikh Rouhou (Arabic: نهال شيخ روحو ; born 5 January 1987 in Sfax, Tunisia) is a Tunisian judoka. She competed at the 2008 and 2012 Summer Olympics in the +78 kg event.

At the 2008 Summer Olympics, she beat Carmen Chalá in the first round before losing to Kim Na-Young.

At the 2012 Summer Olympics, she lost to Maria Suelen Altheman.

In 2019, she won the gold medal in the women's +78 kg event at the African Games held in Rabat, Morocco.

In 2021, she won one of the bronze medals in her event at the Judo World Masters held in Doha, Qatar. At the 2021 African Judo Championships held in Dakar, Senegal, she won the gold medal in her event. In June 2021, she competed in the women's +78 kg event at the 2021 World Judo Championships held in Budapest, Hungary. She also competed in the women's +78 kg event at the 2020 Summer Olympics in Tokyo, Japan.

She won the silver medal in the women's +78 kg event at the 2022 Mediterranean Games held in Oran, Algeria.

References

External links
 

1987 births
Living people
Tunisian female judoka
Olympic judoka of Tunisia
Judoka at the 2008 Summer Olympics
Judoka at the 2012 Summer Olympics
Judoka at the 2016 Summer Olympics
Judoka at the 2020 Summer Olympics
People from Sfax
Mediterranean Games silver medalists for Tunisia
Mediterranean Games bronze medalists for Tunisia
Mediterranean Games medalists in judo
Competitors at the 2009 Mediterranean Games
Competitors at the 2013 Mediterranean Games
Competitors at the 2018 Mediterranean Games
Competitors at the 2022 Mediterranean Games
African Games gold medalists for Tunisia
African Games medalists in judo
Competitors at the 2011 All-Africa Games
Competitors at the 2019 African Games
21st-century Tunisian women